Qaleh-ye Teyn (also Romanized as Qal‘eh-ye Teyn; also known as Qalateyn) is a village in Bayat Rural District, Nowbaran District, Saveh County, Markazi Province, Iran. At the 2006 census, its population was 99, in 40 families.

References 

Populated places in Saveh County